Freddy Jesús Martín Mex (born 14 April 1987) is a Mexican former professional footballer who played as a forward.

Personal life
Freddy's younger brother, Henry, is also a professional footballer who plays as a forward.

References

External links

Living people
1987 births
Venados F.C. players
Dorados de Sinaloa footballers
Alebrijes de Oaxaca players
Liga MX players
Ascenso MX players
Liga Premier de México players
Sportspeople from Mérida, Yucatán
Footballers from Yucatán
Association football forwards
Mexican footballers